The Xbox network, formerly and still sometimes branded as Xbox Live, is an online multiplayer gaming and digital media delivery service created and operated by Microsoft. It was first made available to the Xbox system on November 15, 2002. An updated version of the service became available for the Xbox 360 console at the system's launch in November 2005, and a further enhanced version was released in 2013 with the Xbox One. This same version is also used with Xbox Series X and Series S. This service, in addition to a Microsoft account, is the account for Xbox consoles; accounts can store games and other content.

The service was extended in 2007 on the Windows platform, named Games for Windows – Live, which makes most aspects of the system available on Windows computers. Microsoft has announced plans to extend Live to other platforms such as handhelds and mobile phones as part of the Live Anywhere initiative. With Microsoft's mobile operating system, Windows Phone, full Xbox Live functionality is integrated into new Windows Phones that launched since late 2010. The service shut down for the original Xbox on April 15, 2010, and original Xbox Games are now only playable online through local area network (LAN) tunneling applications such as XLink Kai.

Xbox network service is available as both a free service and a subscription-based service known as Xbox Live Gold. Microsoft rebranded Xbox Live as "Xbox network" in March 2021 to cover all of its services related to Xbox and distinguish the Xbox Live Gold subscription service from these other services.

Availability
The Xbox network is available in 42 countries.

  Argentina*
  Australia
  Austria
  Belgium
  Brazil
  Canada
  Chile*
  China
  Colombia*
  Czech Republic
  Denmark
  Finland

  France
  Germany
  Greece
  Hong Kong
  Hungary
  India
  Ireland
  Israel
  Italy
  Japan
  Mexico
  Netherlands

  New Zealand
  Norway
  Poland
  Portugal
  Russia*
  Saudi Arabia*
  Singapore
  Slovakia
  South Africa
  South Korea
  Spain
  Sweden

  Switzerland
  Taiwan
  Turkey
  United Arab Emirates*
  United Kingdom
  United States

'*' = Country where Xbox Network and Store are officially available, but the Store is in Global currency USD, not in local currency.

Users from other countries are not officially supported, although it is possible for them to access Xbox network if they provide an address located in a country where Xbox network is officially available. The country selected during account creation affects the payment options, content, and services available to the user. Previously, users were unable to change their account region, but in October 2012, Microsoft introduced an account migration tool as a pilot project, which allows the user to change their region and maintain their Xbox network profile. Subscriptions, such as that for Xbox Music, cannot be transferred with this method.

On May 18, 2011, Microsoft announced that it planned to launch Xbox network in the Middle East within the next twelve months, but it never occurred during that time period. However, on October 20, 2012, Microsoft officially announced the service will be launching in the United Arab Emirates and Saudi Arabia in three days time.
On November 4, Microsoft announced that the service would be launched on November 29 in Argentina and Israel. The service also appeared in the following month in Slovakia and Turkey. The service was launched in China in late 2014.

History

Launch with the original Xbox

As Microsoft developed the original Xbox console, online gaming was designated as one of the key pillars for the greater Xbox strategy. Sega had made an attempt to capitalize on the ever-growing online gaming scene when it launched the Dreamcast video game console in 1999, including online support as standard, with the SegaNet service in North America and Dreamarena in Europe. Nevertheless, due to lack of widespread broadband adoption at the time, the Dreamcast shipped with only a dial-up modem while a later-released broadband adapter was neither widely supported nor widely available. Downloadable content was available, though limited in size due to the narrowband connection and the size limitations of a memory card. The PlayStation 2 did not initially ship with built-in networking capabilities.

Microsoft, however, hoped that the Xbox would succeed where the Dreamcast had failed. The company determined that intense online gaming required the throughput of a broadband connection and the storage space of a hard disk drive, and thus these features would be vital to the new platform. This would allow not only for significant downloadable content, such as new levels, maps, weapons, challenges and characters, to be downloaded quickly and stored, but also would make it possible to standardize bandwidth intensive features such as voice communication. Steve Ballmer and Bill Gates both had a vision of making premium download content and add-ons that would attract many new customers. Based on this reasoning, the console included a standard Ethernet port (10/100) in order to provide connectivity to common broadband networks, but did not include a modem or any dial-up support, and its online service was designed to support broadband users only. Critics scoffed at it, citing poor broadband adoption at the turn of the century.

When the Xbox launched on November 15, 2001, the as-yet unnamed online service was destined for a Summer 2002 deployment. Xbox Live was finally given a name at E3 2002 when the service was unveiled in its entirety. Sound-dampened booths and broadband-connected Xbox consoles—featuring an early version of Unreal Championship—demonstrated the service on the show floor. The Epic title was one of the flagship titles for the service, which was slated for a debut on November 15, 2002, marking the anniversary of the Xbox launch. Microsoft announced that 50 Xbox Live titles would be available by the end of 2003. Utilizing the required broadband bandwidth, Xbox Live featured a unified gaming "Friends List", as well as a single identity across all titles (regardless of the publisher), and standardized voice chat with a headset and communication, a feature that was still in its infancy.

Leading up to the launch, Microsoft enlisted several waves of beta testers to improve the service and receive feature feedback. The first wave of beta testers were given Re-Volt! (which was never released officially) and NFL Fever 2003 to beta test. Once beta testing concluded, Microsoft sent these beta testers a translucent orange memory card, a headset carrying case, and a beta tester t-shirt with the slogan "I've got great hands".  When the service debuted, it lacked much of the functionality that later titles included, but Xbox Live grew and evolved on the Xbox and many aspects of the service were included with the Xbox 360 console out of the box, rather than through a later update. Microsoft granted Live-related patent that gives Xbox 360 users access to watch other gamers compete against each other over Xbox Live.

The packaging for playable Xbox Live titles on the original Xbox console featured a trademark luminescent orange-gold bar underneath the Xbox header. Tom Clancy's Splinter Cell and Brute Force sported a Live "bubble" design, as they only featured downloadable content. It was changed later, wherein all Xbox Live titles included the universal orange-gold Live bar. By the time of the Xbox 360, all titles were required to provide at least a limited form of Xbox Live "awareness". In July 2004, Xbox Live had reached 1 million online users. In July 2005, Xbox Live had reached 2 million online users.

Subsequent growth

On November 15, 2007, Microsoft celebrated Xbox Live's 5th anniversary by offering its then over 8 million subscribers the title Carcassonne free of charge and awarding gamers who had subscribed to Live since its inception 500 free Microsoft Points. Due to intermittent service interruptions during late December 2007 and early January 2008, Microsoft promised to offer a free Xbox Live Arcade game to all Xbox Live users as compensation, in an open letter to all Xbox Live members from Marc Whitten, Xbox LIVE General Manager.  Increased demand from Xbox 360 purchasers (the largest number of new user sign-ups in the history of Xbox Live) was given as the reason for the downtime. On January 18, 2008, Microsoft announced Undertow would be offered free to both Gold and Free members for the week starting January 23 through January 27 as compensation.

On November 12, 2009, Dennis Durkin, COO of Microsoft's interactive entertainment business, announced that November 10, 2009, the release of Call of Duty: Modern Warfare 2 marked the busiest day ever on Xbox Live, with over two million active users simultaneously.

On February 5, 2010, Marc Whitten announced that Xbox Live had reached 23 million members. On the same day, Larry Hyrb, Xbox Live's Major Nelson, announced on his blog that Xbox Live support for the original Xbox would be discontinued on April 15, 2010, including online play through backwards compatibility on the Xbox 360 and all downloadable content for original Xbox games.

In August 2010, Microsoft announced an increase to the cost of Xbox Live Gold in several countries by 20%, for the first time since its inception. The basic service was also renamed. Prior to October 2010, the free service was known as Xbox Live Silver.

It was announced on June 10, 2011, that the service is going to be fully integrated into Microsoft's Windows 8.

In October 2011, Microsoft announced live streaming cable television with various providers.

In February 2013, Yusuf Mehdi, corporate vice president of Microsoft's Interactive Entertainment Business, shared that Xbox Live members now number 46 million, up 15 percent from a year ago, during the Dive into Media conference in Southern California.

In June 2014, Microsoft retracted the Xbox Live Gold requirements to access streaming media apps (including Netflix, Hulu, YouTube, Internet Explorer, Skype, and others), though various rental or subscription fees may still apply.

On December 25, 2014, both PlayStation Network and Xbox Live suffered network disruption after a denial-of-service attack. Functionality was restored on December 28, with some users experiencing difficulties in the days that followed. A group called, "The Phantom Squad" has threatened to disrupt the Xbox Live network through a denial-of-service attack on December 25, 2015.

In 2019, the Official Xbox Magazine revealed that Xbox Live would be made cross platform, and will serve Android, iOS and Nintendo Switch.

Microsoft added Xbox Live Gold to its Xbox Game Pass program as part of a new Xbox Game Pass Ultimate subscription tier in April 2019.

Rebranding
On January 22, 2021, Microsoft planned to increase the prices for the Xbox Live Gold subscriptions, as follows: by $1 for the monthly subscription ($10.99 from $9.99), by $5 for the 3-month subscription ($29.99 from $24.99), by $20 for the 6-month subscription ($59.99 from $39.99), and by $60 (double the price) for the 12-month subscription ($119.99 from $59.99). However, the 6-month and 12-month subscription price increases would not affect existing subscribers when they resubscribed at the same level, nor those already subscribed through the Xbox Games Pass Ultimate program. However, after complaints from the Xbox community, Microsoft made an announcement on the same day that they revoked their decision, and that they would not increase the prices of any of the subscriptions, thus they would remain the same as they were. 

Microsoft officially announced that they would be branding Xbox Live as "Xbox network" in March 2021 as to cover all the services related to Xbox and not just Xbox Live. Xbox Live Gold would remain the same name and to distinguish the subscription program from the set of services. Microsoft also stated that with this, it will eliminate the requirement to have Xbox Live Gold to play free-to-play games on Xbox consoles.

By January 2021, Microsoft reported that there were more than 100 million Xbox users (including those through the Xbox Game Pass subscription).

User information

Gamertag
A Gamertag is the universal name for a player's username on Xbox Live. A Gamertag is a unique identifier that can include numbers, letters, and spaces. Gamertags can be changed using an Xbox One or Xbox 360 console (first time is free, all other changes afterwards are charged), while the Xbox 360 supports eight Xbox Live-enabled profiles per memory unit and thirty-two profiles on the hard drive.

A player's Gamertag account status can be checked using a variety of online tools, which is useful especially when looking for a new Gamertag, or confirming that a Gamertag exists. Using a valid Gamertag, any player can be located and messaged from within Live. There are also several websites which allow users of Gamertags to upload photos and information about themselves.

Gamertags can be used in a variety of places, including Games for Windows – Live, Zune, XNA Creators Club, and of course on Xbox One and Xbox 360.

Gamertags also contain avatar images (or "gamer pictures"), sometimes associated with certain games or game characters. On Xbox 360 individual gamerpics are available, but they are usually bundled into packs. It is also possible to take "Public" pictures (which are shown to all that view a profile, unless the user has a different "personal" picture set) which can be taken of avatars while using the avatar editor.

Users were formerly forbidden to use strings such as gay or refer to homosexuality in any way in their Gamertag or profile due to it being considered "content of a sexual nature", even if the string occurs in a legitimate surname. Incidents where a woman was suspended from the service for identifying herself as a lesbian, and an incident where a male user was suspended for using his surname "Gaywood" in his username attracted controversy. In February 2009, Xbox Live Lead Program Manager for Enforcement Stephen Toulouse clarified the service's policy on sexual identification, stating that "Expression of any sexual orientation [...] is not allowed in Gamertags" but that the company is "examining how we can provide it in a way that won't get misused." Changes announced in March 2010 permit Xbox Live members to express sexual orientation in their gamertags and profiles.

Gamerscore
The Gamerscore (G) is an achievements point accumulation system that reflects the number of achievements accumulated by a user on Xbox Live through the displaying of the number of points accumulated. These Achievement points are awarded for the completion of game-specific challenges, such as beating a level or amassing a specified number of wins against other players in online matches and other various in game challenges.

Initially, retail Xbox 360 games offered up to 1,000G spread over a variable number of Achievements, while each Xbox Live Arcade title contained 12 Achievements totaling 200G. On February 1, 2007, Microsoft announced on their Gamerscore Blog some new policies that developers must follow related to Gamerscore and Achievements in future releases. All regular disc-based games must have 1,000 Gamerscore points in the base game; the title can ship with fewer than 1,000 points, but anything added later must be free. Game developers also now have the option of adding up to 250 points via downloadable content every quarter after the first year of release (for a total of 1,750 points). Xbox Live Arcade titles also allow players to obtain Gamerscore, initially up to 200 Gamerscore with additional points up to 50 Gamerscore via downloadable content (for a total of 250 points), but some XBLA games now contain up to 400 Gamerscore without DLC.

On May 26, 2007, Halo 2 was the first Games for Windows title to feature Achievements, which counted towards a player's Gamerscore.

On March 25, 2008, Microsoft cracked down on "Gamerscore cheaters" (those who used external tools to artificially inflate their Gamerscore), and reduced their Gamerscores to zero without the option to recover the scores that had been "earned", and branded the player by denoting on their Gamertag that they were a "Cheater".

The development of the Gamerscore system has created a new niche in the internet economy. Many websites  have been created to provide gamers with tips and tricks for getting achievement points. Some sites are solely devoted to these achievement guides, and some blogs provide gaming guides in addition to their other content.

On March 13, 2014, Ray Cox IV or "Stallion83" became the first player in history to reach 1 million Gamerscore.

Gamecard
The Gamecard is an information panel used to summarize one's user profile on Microsoft's Xbox Live. The pieces of information on a Gamercard include:
 Gamertag (in front a silver or gold bar) (active gold members who have had Xbox Live for less than a year feature small bubbles. Anything a year or over will feature the number of years.)
 Gamer picture (avatar)
 Reputation
 Gamerscore
 Gamer Zone
 Recent games played

A player's Gamercard can be viewed via the Xbox 360 Dashboard, or online through Xbox.com. The top bar that displays the Gamertag is shown in front of either a silver or gold bar which designates if the gamer has an Xbox Live Free or Gold subscription (respectively). If the gamer is part of the Xbox 360 Launch Team, the top bar will also have additional text stating "Launch Team" in the background. Third-party sites allow users to post a rendered version of their Gamercard as a small Flash applet or JPEG image on any website or Internet forum.

Similarly, Mac OS X users can download widgets that display their Xbox Live Gamercard within Mac OS X's Dashboard. These can be downloaded onto any Mac with OS X 10.4 or higher via Apple's widget download page.

There are four Gamer Zones; Recreation is for casual gamers, Family is for family-friendly gamers (without profanity, etc.), Pro is for competitive gamers who enjoy a challenge, and Underground is for no-holds-barred gaming where anything goes (as long as it does not violate the Xbox Live Terms of Use). However, in practice these gamer zones are displayed only on the Gamercard of the player, and do not tend to affect the gameplay experience or the matching of players in online games.

TrueSkill

TrueSkill is a ranking and matchmaking system which was first implemented as part of the Xbox 360's Live services. Developed at Microsoft Research Cambridge (United Kingdom), the TrueSkill ranking system is now used in over 150 titles for the Xbox 360 and in the Games for Windows – Live game Warhammer 40,000: Dawn of War II. It uses a mathematical model of uncertainty to address weaknesses in existing ranking systems such as Elo. For example, a new player joining million-player leagues can be ranked correctly in fewer than 20 games. It can predict the probability of each game outcome, which enhances competitive matchmaking, making it possible to assemble skill-balanced teams from a group of players with different abilities.

When matchmaking, the system attempts to match individuals based on their estimated skill level. If two individuals are competing head-to-head and have the same estimated skill level with low estimate uncertainty, they should each have roughly a 50% chance of winning a match. In this way, the system attempts to make every match as competitive as possible.

In order to prevent abuse of the system, the majority of ranked games have relatively limited options for matchmaking. By design, players cannot easily play with their friends in ranked games. However, these countermeasures have failed due to techniques such as alternate account(s) and system flaws where each system has its own individual TrueSkill rating. To provide less competitive games, the system supports unranked Player Matches, which allow individuals of any skill level to be paired (often including "guests" on an account). Such matches do not contribute to the TrueSkill rating.

Xbox Games Store

Xbox Games Store (formerly Xbox Live Marketplace) is a unified storefront which offers both free and premium content for download including Xbox Live Arcade titles, Xbox indie games, original Xbox games, Xbox 360 game demos, game expansion material (e.g. extra maps, vehicles, songs), trailers, gamer pictures and themes, television shows, music videos, movie rentals, Apps and games and more.

On November 17, 2009, Microsoft released a downloadable Zune application for the Xbox 360. This application turns the Xbox 360 into a Zune device. Once one downloads the Zune application, it takes over the Marketplace menus and sections of the console. With the addition of the Zune Marketplace to an Xbox 360 console, one is able to purchase movies instead of only being able to rent them. The Zune Marketplace has a much more extensive content offering compared to the classic Xbox Live Marketplace.

Xbox Play Anywhere 

Xbox Play Anywhere is a cross-buy program announced at E3 2016 and launched September 13, 2016. Under the scheme, supported games purchased digitally on Microsoft Store for Xbox One can also be downloaded on a Windows 10 PC (running Windows 10 Anniversary Update or later) through Microsoft Store using the same Microsoft account at no additional charge, and vice versa. The scheme also promotes the ability to synchronize save data, achievements, and downloadable content between Windows 10 and Xbox One versions of a game.

Xbox Live Gold

Xbox Live Gold is a paid subscription service for the Xbox community. Signing up to Xbox Live is free, but a recurring subscription fee is required to access for Gold. Features that require a Gold subscription include online multiplayer in non-multiplayer games, game recording and media sharing. Similarly, ordinary Xbox Live members can download and access the Twitch live streaming application, but in order to broadcast gameplay of one's own, a Gold subscription is necessary. While initially requiring Gold, free-to-play titles, as well as the party chat feature on Xbox consoles, no longer need a subscription to play as of April 2021. Subscribers are allocated storage space on Xbox servers for storing files, and are granted early or exclusive access to betas, special offers, Games with Gold, and Video Kinect.

Games with Gold
Games with Gold is a program in which digital downloads of games are offered at no charge to Gold subscribers. Games with Gold launched for Xbox 360 in July 2013, while Xbox One games were added in June 2014. After October 2022, Games with Gold will no longer offer Xbox 360 games, with Microsoft stating that they "have reached the limit of our ability to bring Xbox 360 games to the catalogue". Games downloaded through the program on Xbox 360 are free to own with no further restrictions. Xbox One Games with Gold titles require an active Gold subscription in order to use, and become locked and unplayable if the subscription lapses. As of November 2015, all Games with Gold titles for Xbox 360 are backwards compatible on Xbox One.

Microsoft Movies & TV / Microsoft Films & TV
On November 6, 2006, Microsoft announced Microsoft Movies & TV (Microsoft Films & TV in other supported countries) (formerly Xbox Video Marketplace, Xbox Video and Zune Video), an exclusive video store accessible through the console. Launched in the United States on November 22, 2006, the first anniversary of the Xbox 360's launch, the service allows users in the United States to download high-definition and standard-definition television shows for purchase and movies for rental onto an Xbox 360 console for viewing. With the exception of short clips, content is not currently available for streaming, and must be downloaded. Movies are available for rental from the Video Marketplace. They expire in 14 days after download or at the end of the first 24 hours after the movie has begun playing, whichever comes first. Television episodes can be purchased to own, and are transferable to an unlimited number of consoles. Downloaded files use 5.1 surround audio and are encoded using VC-1 for video at 720p, with a bitrate of 6.8 Mbit/s. Television content is offered from MTV, VH1, Comedy Central, Turner Broadcasting and CBS; and movie content is Warner Bros., Paramount and Disney, along with other publishers.

Programs
The "Game with Fame" initiative has been Microsoft's way to connect Xbox Live members with celebrities and game developers. Notable participants of "Game with Fame" include Shia LaBeouf, Jack Black, Rihanna, Velvet Revolver, Victoria Justice, Shaun Wright-Phillips, Scissor Sisters, Paramore, Korn, OK Go, Red Jumpsuit Apparatus, Dream Theater, Linkin Park, Green Day and Insane Clown Posse.

"Xbox Ambassadors" are Xbox Live members selected by Microsoft who have proven themselves to be helpful towards others, and are willing to assist new Xbox Live users and answer their questions. As of March 2009, there are ambassadors representing 18 countries in more than 30 languages.

"Xbox Rewards" was a promotion designed to provide gamers incentives to play on Xbox Live by subsidizing achievement points earned with actual rewards. Gamers were required to register for specific challenges which, if successfully completed, would yield a challenge-specific reward.

"Xbox Live Rewards" is a current promotion providing Xbox Live members with Reward Points (not to be confused with the defunct Microsoft Points) when they renew their Gold Membership, buy something on the Marketplace, etc.

"Xbox Live Labs" was a program found in the community section and was available from March 10 to 27, 2011 for members in the United States. If a player chose to participate, they were rewarded with avatar items and 3 zero-point achievements.

Metamessage was a show which aimed to answer questions sent in by viewers on anything related to the world of Xbox. The show ran for four series and was released every other Saturday. The show was driven entirely by user-generated questions. To ensure the volume of questions remained high, fans could contact the show in a variety of ways, including sending questions to the Metamessage Gamertag over Xbox LIVE, writing an email, or using social network websites.

Security
Microsoft implements a number of different security measures on its Xbox Live service. One of these takes the form of a proactive security check that assures that only unmodified machines may access their service. On May 17, 2007, Microsoft banned consoles with modified firmware from Xbox Live. According to Microsoft, consoles with firmware of unknown origin, quality or intent were banned permanently from Xbox Live. A Microsoft representative indicated that the action was taken to assure "the integrity of the service and protect our partners and users."

It has been discovered that pretexting has been used to impersonate an Xbox Live user for sabotage. Microsoft has implemented greater security to decrease the service's susceptibility to social engineering.

In early November 2009 Microsoft banned approximately 1 million consoles with modified firmware from Xbox Live.

In October 2011, users of Xbox Live reported having unauthorized access to their Xbox Live accounts, with Microsoft points subsequently being used and/or bought to purchase various in-game items for FIFA 12. Microsoft is responding to such incidents by restricting access to the account for 25 days whilst the fraud team investigates. Both EA and Microsoft have denied that there is a problem with security.

On December 25, 2014, both PlayStation Network and Xbox Live suffered network disruption after a denial-of-service attack. Functionality was restored on December 28, with some users experiencing difficulties in the days that followed.

First-generation Xbox Live shutdown
Xbox Live for the original Xbox was discontinued by Microsoft on April 15, 2010, encouraging gamers to upgrade to the Xbox 360. Through loopholes and flaws, however, users were still able to play after the provided time and date Microsoft announced the shutdown. Users could continue interacting in the network, however new users could not enter the system. Notably, 14 users played Halo 2 until May 11, 2010. Though official Xbox Live service has been discontinued for the original Xbox, tunneling software such as Xlink Kai exists, allowing original Xbox users to play system link games such as Halo 2 with other people from around the world, much like Xbox Live.

The "Noble 14" 
The Noble 14 were a band of users who continued to play Halo 2 until May 11, 2010, days after the service was officially discontinued by Microsoft. The users would play custom games together, with all attempting to stay on for as long as possible. An Xbox spokesperson made a statement regarding the Noble 14, "A small band of a committed few, engaged in a battle against insurmountable odds. It's not Noble team from Halo: Reach, it's the final, passionate few who are still playing Halo 2. We wish them the best in their battle against time." The last 12 users were offered Halo: Reach Beta Codes by GamesRadar.com, as well as having their Xbox Live memberships extended by Microsoft. Eventually "Agent Windex" and "Apache N4SIR" were the final two users on the service, however two days after the third user "Lord Odysseus11" was disconnected by an internet drop, user Agent Windex was booted on May 10, stating "Good job Apache, you're the last one." The next day, May 11, Apache N4SIR was booted offline after many hours since Agent Windex was disconnected. He stated that he wanted to play 15 hours, 14 for each member, then one final hour for the community.

Live Anywhere

Live Anywhere is an initiative by Microsoft to bring the Live online gaming and entertainment network to a wide variety of platforms and devices, including Xbox, Xbox 360, Microsoft Windows (XP SP2/SP3, Vista and 7), Windows Phone, Java-based phones and Zune. The concept service for mobile devices has been demonstrated at E3 and CES on a Motorola Q mobile phone.

Microsoft's Chris Early clarified that Live Anywhere is a long-term project expected to be rolled out over several years.

On February 15, 2010, Microsoft announced its new mobile operating system, Windows Phone. With Windows Phone 7, Microsoft has integrated full Xbox Live functionality into Windows Phone.

Microsoft announced in March 2019 that it would be providing Xbox Live SDKs for iOS and Android mobile devices, allowing developers on those platforms to integrate most services of Xbox Live into their applications and games. Microsoft also stated that they are looking to bring this functionality to the Nintendo Switch, anticipating this to be a post-launch feature for the Switch port of Cuphead.

Revenue

Bloomberg estimates that Xbox network likely generated over $1 billion in revenue in the 2010 fiscal year, which ended on June 30, 2010.

See also
 Nintendo Network
 Nintendo Switch Online
 PlayStation Network
 Windows Live

References

External links

 

 
Multiplayer video game services